The Women's Overall in the 2020 FIS Alpine Skiing World Cup involved 30 events in 6 disciplines: downhill (DH), Super-G (SG), giant slalom (GS), slalom (SL), Alpine combined (AC), and parallel (PAR). This was the first year that parallel was treated as a separate discipline; prior to the 2019-20 season, it had been a sub-element of the slalom discipline. The season had originally been scheduled to have 41 races (plus one mixed-team race at the World Cup finals), but 11 races that had originally been scheduled (and the mixed-team race) were canceled during the season, mostly due to the COVID-19 pandemic, as discussed below.

As a side note, in a preseason vote FIS voted to change its official designation in the English language (but not in French or German) for female competitors from "Ladies" to "Women".. All new FIS documents in English will immediately begin to use the new terminology.

Three-time defending champion Mikaela Shiffrin of the United States had established a significant lead when her father Jeff suffered what proved to be a fatal head injury at the start of February, and Shiffrin missed the remainder of the season. After her departure, the two skiers closest to her in the overall standings, Federica Brignone of Italy and Petra Vlhová of Slovakia, competed in every event remaining in the season, regardless of the discipline, in an attempt to pass Shiffrin.

Brignone grabbed the lead when she won the Alpine combined race in Crans Montana on 23 February and Vlhová, who had been second-fastest in the Super-G leg, straddled a gate in the slalom and didn't score any points. After just one more race six days later, the season was terminated; all of the final ten events were canceled due to a combination of bad weather for the first three and the COVID-19 pandemic for the remainder. As a result, Brignone became the first Italian woman ever to win the women's overall World Cup championship and the crystal globe that comes with it.

Standings

See also
 2020 Alpine Skiing World Cup – Women's summary rankings
 2020 Alpine Skiing World Cup – Women's Downhill
 2020 Alpine Skiing World Cup – Women's Super-G
 2020 Alpine Skiing World Cup – Women's Giant Slalom
 2020 Alpine Skiing World Cup – Women's Slalom
 2020 Alpine Skiing World Cup – Women's Combined
 2020 Alpine Skiing World Cup – Women's Parallel
 2020 Alpine Skiing World Cup – Men's Overall
 World Cup scoring system

References

External links
 Alpine Skiing at FIS website

Women's Overall
FIS Alpine Ski World Cup overall titles